David Feinstein may refer to:

 Rabbi Dovid Feinstein
 David "Rock" Feinstein, guitarist in the bands Elf and The Rods
 David Feinstein, clinical psychologist and proponent of Emotional Freedom Techniques